Athletics or track and field competitions at the 2019 Southeast Asian Games were held from 6 to 10 December 2019. Athletics are held in the New Clark City Athletics Stadium from 6 to 10  December 2019. The New Clark City Athletics Stadium was used as its venue.

Medal summary

Medal table

Men's events

Women's events

Mixed

References

External links